Dane Tyrez Jackson (born November 29, 1996) is an American football cornerback for the Buffalo Bills of the National Football League (NFL). He played college football at Pittsburgh and was drafted by the Bills in the seventh round of the 2020 NFL Draft.

High school career
Jackson played high school football at Quaker Valley High School because the high school he attended, Cornell High School, did not have a football team. Jackson was an all-state basketball player for Cornell. He committed to Pittsburgh on June 24, 2014, choosing the Panthers over Bowling Green and Duquesne. He committed the day after then-Pitt coach Paul Chryst offered Jackson a scholarship after seeing him at a Pitt prospect camp.

College career
After playing quarterback in high school, Jackson transitioned to cornerback at Pitt. He redshirted his freshman year and played mostly in a reserve role his redshirt freshman year, but then started every game during his sophomore, junior and senior seasons with Pitt. As a senior, he led Pitt with 12 pass breakups, and had 43 tackles, three for a loss, an interception and a sack assist. After his senior season, Jackson was named second-team all-Atlantic Coast Conference and took part in the 2020 Senior Bowl.

College statistics

Professional career 

The Buffalo Bills selected Jackson in the seventh round with the 239th overall pick in the 2020 NFL Draft. Jackson signed a four-year, $3.376 million contract with the Bills on May 7, 2020. He was placed on the reserve/COVID-19 list by the team on July 30, but was activated a week later. He was waived on September 5, 2020 and signed to the practice squad the next day.

Following injuries to cornerbacks Levi Wallace and Josh Norman, Jackson was elevated to the active roster on October 13, 2020, and reverted to the practice squad after the game. He was elevated to the active roster on October 24 for the team's week 7 game against the New York Jets, and reverted to the practice squad after the game. Against the Jets, he finished with three tackles, two passes defensed, and one interception as the Bills won 18–10. He was elevated again on October 31, November 7, November 14, and January 2, 2021, for the team's weeks 8, 9, 10, and 17 games against the New England Patriots, Seattle Seahawks, Arizona Cardinals, and Miami Dolphins, and reverted to the practice squad after each game. He was elevated again on January 15 and January 23 for the divisional playoff game and AFC Championship Game against the Baltimore Ravens and Kansas City Chiefs, and reverted to the practice squad again following each game. On January 26, 2021, Jackson signed a reserves/futures contract with the Bills.

Jackson suffered a neck injury during a Monday Night Football game versus the Tennessee Titans on September 19, 2022 after colliding with teammate Tremaine Edmunds as the two attempted to tackle an opposing player. He was removed from the field in an ambulance, but was released from the hospital the following day after it was determined he had avoided major damage to the neck and spinal cord. 

On March 17, 2023, Jackson re-signed with the Bills on a one-year contract.

NFL career statistics

Regular season

Postseason

References

External links
 Buffalo Bills bio
 Pitt Panthers bio

Living people
1996 births
People from Coraopolis, Pennsylvania
Players of American football from Pennsylvania
Sportspeople from the Pittsburgh metropolitan area
American football cornerbacks
Pittsburgh Panthers football players
Buffalo Bills players